Matt Forster (19 August 1900 – July 1976) was a professional footballer who played for Tottenham Hotspur, Reading and Charlton Athletic.

Football career 
Forster a full back joined Tottenham from Newburn in 1920 and made 244 appearances in all competitions for the club. He joined Reading in 1930 and went on to feature in a further 70 matches before making the move to Charlton Athletic in 1933 and play a solitary game.

References 

1900 births
1976 deaths
People from Newburn
Footballers from Tyne and Wear
English footballers
English Football League players
Tottenham Hotspur F.C. players
Reading F.C. players
Charlton Athletic F.C. players
Association football fullbacks